Jarnail Singh (1973 – 14 May 2021) was an Indian journalist and politician belonging to the Aam Aadmi Party (AAP). He was a member of the Delhi Legislative Assembly, representing the Rajouri Garden constituency until 6 January 2017, when he resigned as MLA to compete for the AAP against sitting CM Parkash Singh Badal.

Education and journalism career 

Jarnail Singh obtained a diploma in journalism from the YMCA Institute for Media Studies and Information Technology. He started his career as a reporter for Amar Ujala. He then worked as a correspondent with the Hindi-language daily Dainik Jagran for over a decade.

Singh gained media attention when he threw a shoe at India's Home Minister P. Chidambaram during a press conference on 7 April 2009. Singh was upset that the minister's party, the Indian National Congress, had given poll tickets to leaders who had been accused of instigating the 1984 anti-Sikh pogrom. The leaders had been "cleared" of any involvement by the Central Bureau of Investigation (CBI) when the Congress government was in power. Responding to Jarnail Singh's question, Chidambaram stated that the CBI had not acted under government pressure, and had only submitted its reports to the court and that it was up to the courts to make a decision. Singh was not satisfied with the answer and threw a shoe at the minister in protest. Singh later stated:

I admit my method was wrong, but the sentiment was right. I do not wish that any journalist should behave in this manner.

Chidambaram did not press charges against him.

Political career 
Jarnail Singh contested the 2014 general elections as an AAP candidate from West Delhi. He lost to Pravesh Verma of BJP by a margin of 268,586 votes. In 2015 Delhi Assembly elections, he won from the Rajouri Garden constituency. He is sometimes confused with Jarnail Singh, an AAP MLA from Tilak Nagar in Delhi.

Singh died from COVID-19 in 2021.

References

External links
 Profile on AAP website 

2021 deaths
Aam Aadmi Party candidates in the 2014 Indian general election
Indian newspaper journalists
Indian Sikhs
Delhi MLAs 2015–2020
Aam Aadmi Party politicians from Delhi
1973 births
Journalists from Delhi
Deaths from the COVID-19 pandemic in India